Receptor-type tyrosine-protein phosphatase alpha is an enzyme that in humans is encoded by the PTPRA gene.

Function 

The protein encoded by this gene is a member of the protein tyrosine phosphatase (PTP) family. PTPs are known to be signaling molecules that regulate a variety of cellular processes including cell growth, differentiation, mitotic cycle, and oncogenic transformation. This PTP contains an extracellular domain, a single transmembrane segment and two tandem intracytoplasmic catalytic domains, and thus represents a receptor-type PTP. This PTP has been shown to dephosphorylate and activate Src family tyrosine kinases, and is implicated in the regulation of integrin signaling, cell adhesion and proliferation. Three alternatively spliced variants of this gene, which encode two distinct isoforms, have been reported.

Interactions 

PTPRA has been shown to interact with Grb2 and KCNA2.

References

Further reading